Comper is a surname. Notable people with the surname include:

F. Anthony Comper (born 1945), known as Tony Comper, is a Canadian banker
John Comper (1823–1903), Anglican Priest who served in the Episcopal Church in Scotland
Nicholas Comper (1897–1939), English aviator and aircraft designer
Ninian Comper (1864–1960), Scottish architect

See also
Château de Comper, castle located in Paimpont forest (formerly known as Brocéliande) in the département of Morbihan, Bretagne, France
Comper Aircraft Company, 1930s British light aircraft manufacturer
Comper Kite, single engined, two seat touring monoplane
Comper Mouse, 1930s British three-seat cabin monoplane
Comper Streak, single engined, single seat racing monoplane
Comper Swift, British 1930s single-seat sporting aircraft